The Myrzhyk Range is a mountain massif in the Abai Region, Kazakhstan. The northwestern corner of the range is in Karkaraly District, Karaganda Region.

Myrzyk village is located at the feet of the northern slopes of the range,  to the northeast of Karkaraly city. There is an extensive burial ground of the early Bronze Age in the area of the range.

Geography   
The Myrzhyk Range is part of the Kazakh Upland system (Saryarka). It is a range of moderate altitude located in the northeastern sector of the highlands. Myrzhyk is slightly lower than the massifs in its immediate vicinity, but its size is significantly larger. A lake named Karasor lies off the west of the northwestern end of the range.

The higher elevations consist of summits of exposed rock.  long river Saryozen, of the Irtysh basin, has its sources in the range.

Flora
Steppe vegetation is present in the areas where there is soil between the rocks, including sagebrush, sedges and shrubs. There are meadows growing in protected valleys and ravines, as well as clumps of birch, willow, wild rose and juniper.

See also
Geography of Kazakhstan

References

External links
The implication of diachronic changes reflected in LBA bronze assemblages of Central Kazakhstan
Могильник Сангыру-1 — Қарағанды Мәдениет
Kazakh Uplands

kk:Мыржық жотасы